Same-sex relationships are recognised in the microstate of Monaco. On 4 December 2019, the National Council passed a bill establishing cohabitation agreements, offering both same-sex and opposite-sex couples limited rights and benefits in the areas of inheritance and property. The law took effect on 27 June 2020.

Cohabitation agreements

The legislative process leading to the recognition of same-sex couples started in the early 2010s. In November 2010, an interview mentioned that Jean-Charles Gardetto, a member of the National Council and lawyer, was preparing a draft bill intending to legally define cohabitation, either for heterosexual or for homosexual couples. On 18 June 2013, the opposition Union Monégasque party submitted a bill to Parliament to establish gender-neutral cohabitation agreements. The bill was immediately sent to the Women and Family Rights Commission for consideration. In July 2015, the commission's president said that debate on the bill would begin in late 2015. Originally submitted as pacte de vie commune, the bill was amended to establish a "cohabitation agreement". The bill's rapporteur, Jean-Louis Grinda, submitted his report on 7 September 2016. It noted that the Monegasque administration already recognises concubinage since 2008, and that the European Court of Human Rights considers non-recognition of same-sex relationships to be contrary to the European Convention on Human Rights as per Oliari and Others v Italy. On 27 October 2016, the National Council unanimously approved a resolution mandating the Council of Government to draft a bill recognizing same-sex unions. On 27 April 2017, the Council responded positively to the proposal, and said it would introduce a draft law by April 2018 following the February 2018 elections.

The cohabitation agreement bill was introduced to the National Council on 16 April 2018. Under the bill, cohabiting same-sex and opposite-sex couples would be considered on par with siblings for inheritance tax but not at the same level as married couples. The agreement, which is open to siblings and parents and children as well, also provides an enumerated set of property and social security rights, and reciprocal obligations. The contrat is signed in front of a notary and then deposited at a public registry. The agreement provides some but not all of the rights of marriage. For example, a foreign partner is not eligible for Monegasque citizenship, and both partners cannot share the same surname.

On 4 December 2019, the National Council approved the bill in a unanimous 22–0 vote. The legislation was signed into law by Prince Albert II on 17 December 2019, published in the official journal on 27 December and took effect six months later (i.e. 27 June 2020). Several lawmakers criticized the "hypocritical" opposition of Catholic officials, notably from the Archbishop of Monaco, Bernard Barsi, who had written to all deputies urging them to vote against the bill, noting that the law concerned solely civil matters and not religious ones. Many deputies called the law "long overdue", and president of the National Council Stéphane Valeri called it "great news for all couples".

Same-sex marriage
Same-sex marriage is not recognized in Monaco. The Civil Code of Monaco does not explicitly ban same-sex marriages, but article 116 requires "the man" and "the woman" to be at least 18 years of age to marry. The Constitution of Monaco does not restrict marriage to opposite-sex couples.

Public opinion
According to a survey conducted in 2007 by the Union pour Monaco (UPM) party before the 2007 municipal elections, 51% of the respondents (only native Monegasque inhabitants asked) agreed that living in a registered partnership should be accepted. Monegasques being a minority in Monaco, the survey is not representative of the entire public's opinion.

See also
 LGBT rights in Monaco
 Recognition of same-sex unions in Europe

Notes

References

LGBT rights in Monaco
Monaco